Szymon Syrski (24 October 1824, Łubnie – 13 January 1882, Lwów) was a Polish zoologist.  He was a professor of zoology at Lviv University.

1824 births
1882 deaths
19th-century Polish zoologists